Micrurus diutius, the Trinidad ribbon coral snake, is a species of coral snake in the family Elapidae. Specimens have been identified near Tunapuna. "Diutius" is Latin for "too long".

References 

clarki
Snakes of South America
Reptiles of Guyana
Reptiles of Venezuela
Reptiles of French Guiana
Reptiles described in 1955